The Decoration "For Beneficence" is a decoration of Russia, established on 3 May 2012 by decree of President Dmitry Medvedev.

Criteria
The Decoration "For Beneficence" may be awarded for:

Significant charity efforts to support children’s homes, nursing homes, orphanages, hospices or medical facilities in Russia;
Public works aimed at improving the level of morality and tolerance in society, promoting human values and human rights, and combating the spread of dangerous diseases and habits;
Contributions to the development of Russian science, culture, education or healthcare.
Assisting Non-governmental organizations or religious organisations with socially significant activities.
Efforts aimed at strengthening the institution of marriage and family.

Description
The decoration is a round, silver-gilt medal  in diameter with a raised rim on both sides.  The obverse is colored with blue enamel. In the center is a golden image of a pelican, feeding its young.  Surrounding the image is a gold oak wreath.  The reverse bears the inscription "ЗА БЛАГОДЕЯНИЕ" ("FOR CHARITY") and the number of the award.  The decoration is suspended from a 24 mm moire silk ribbon in blue with thin gold stripes at the edges. The gold stripes are 2 mm wide and 2 mm from the edges of the ribbon.

References

Civil awards and decorations of Russia
Orders, decorations, and medals of Russia
Awards established in 2012